From Dusk till Dawn is an American media franchise created by Robert Kurtzman, including three films, a video game and a TV series.

Films
From Dusk till Dawn is an American horror franchise by the writers and directors Quentin Tarantino and Robert Rodriguez. To date, it includes a motion picture, two direct-to-video sequels, a video game, a comic book, collectable statues, and a TV series.

Danny Trejo is the only actor to appear in all the original three films and the series. Actor Michael Parks appears in both From Dusk till Dawn and The Hangman's Daughter. Rodriguez, Tarantino, and Lawrence Bender served as producers on all of the three films.

From Dusk till Dawn

From Dusk Till Dawn is a 1996 horror crime action thriller film written by Quentin Tarantino and directed by Robert Rodriguez. The movie stars Harvey Keitel, George Clooney, Quentin Tarantino, and Juliette Lewis.

Texas Blood Money

From Dusk till Dawn 2: Texas Blood Money is an American horror crime action thriller released on March 16, 1999. The film was an early test release by Dimension Films for the direct-to-video market. It was co-written and directed by Scott Spiegel, the co-writer of Evil Dead II and director of Intruder. The film was filmed on location in South Africa and features cameos by Bruce Campbell and Tiffani Thiessen. It won a Saturn Award from The Academy of Science Fiction Fantasy & Horror Films for the Best Home Video Release of 1999.

The Hangman's Daughter

From Dusk till Dawn 3: The Hangman's Daughter is a 1999 American horror film that serves as a prequel to the 1996 film, From Dusk till Dawn. It was released directly to video and was nominated for the Saturn Award's Best Home Video Release category.

Cancelled fourth film
In December 2010, the production of a fourth From Dusk till Dawn film was in the planning stages, but further work on this possibility has not been revealed. In 2013, From Dusk till Dawn: The Series, a television adaptation of the films, had begun production, without any further mention of the film.

TV series

Rodriguez developed a TV series for his cable network El Rey. It stars Robert Patrick as Jacob Fuller, Eiza González as Santanico Pandemonium, and Don Johnson as Sheriff McGraw. The series debuted on El Rey in the United States on March 11, 2014, and internationally on Netflix two days later.

Characters

Video game

From Dusk till Dawn is a third-person shooter that is based on events that transpire directly after the end of the film From Dusk till Dawn. Released in 2001 for Windows, it was distributed by Cryo Interactive.

References

External links
 Tribute page at m3 talent agency
 Fan club

 
Films adapted into television shows
Horror film franchises
Action film franchises
Trilogies
1990s English-language films